Route 145 is an arterial road in Winnipeg, Manitoba, Canada.

It follows Wilkes Avenue and the Sterling Lyon Parkway, running east from an interchange at the Perimeter Highway (PTH 100) to Waverley Street (Route 80). Heading west from Winnipeg, it continues as Provincial Road 427 into the Rural Municipality of Headingley. Wilkes Avenue runs parallel to the main Canadian National Railway line.

Route 145 previously followed Wilkes Avenue in its entirety; however, a segment of Wilkes near Kenaston Boulevard (Route 90) was demolished as part of the Kenaston Underpass project in 2005. The Sterling Lyon Parkway was constructed in its place and now makes up the route between Victor Lewis Drive and Shaftesbury Boulevard (Route 96).

Major intersections
From east to west:

References

145